Asud is a small village in Ratnagiri district, Maharashtra state in Western India. The 2011 Census of India recorded a total of 2,450 residents in the village. Asud is 859.98 hectares in size.

References

Villages in Ratnagiri district